Spinosophronica is a genus of longhorn beetles of the subfamily Lamiinae, containing the following species:

 Spinosophronica fusca Breuning, 1948
 Spinosophronica rufa Breuning, 1961

References

Desmiphorini